Chen Danian (born 1978), also known as Danny Chen, is a notable Internet entrepreneur. He is the founder and CEO of LinkSure. The company launched the world’s largest and first-of-its-kind WiFi sharing app, WiFi Master Key.

He is the co-founder and was previously COO of Shanda (NASDAQ: SNDA), which became the largest Internet company in China by market capitalization in 2004.

In 2016, Chen is listed on 40 under 40 (Fortune magazine) as one of most influential young leaders in China. Chen is also ranked 43rd on Fortune’s 2017 list of The Top 50 Most Influential Business Leaders in China.

See also
 WiFi Master Key

References

1978 births
Living people
Shanda people
Businesspeople from Shaoxing
Fudan University alumni
Businesspeople in information technology
Chinese company founders
Chinese computer businesspeople
21st-century Chinese businesspeople